Road Island is the fifth and final album by Ambrosia, released in 1982 on Warner Bros. Records. The album marks the band's return to their progressive rock roots and it was the first one produced by James Guthrie.

Despite positive reviews from critics, the album was a commercial disappointment, peaking at #115 on the Billboard 200. "How Can You Love Me" only managed to reach #86 on the Billboard Hot 100, while "For Openers (Welcome Home)" peaked at #44 on the Mainstream Rock charts.

Track listing

Personnel
Ambrosia
David Pack – guitar, lead and backing vocals, keyboards
Joe Puerta – bass, lead and backing vocals
Burleigh Drummond – drums, backing vocals, percussion, bassoon
David Cutler Lewis – keyboards
Royce Jones – backing vocals
Christopher North – keyboards, backing vocals

Additional musicians
Jim Horn – saxophone (Kid No More)

Production
Producer: James Guthrie
Engineers: Ben Rodgers, Damian Korner, Ernie Sheesley, Simon Hurrell
Art direction and illustration: Ralph Steadman

Charts
Album

Singles

References

External links

Ambrosia (band) albums
1982 albums
Warner Records albums